Roger Evans Howe  (born May 23, 1945) is the William R. Kenan, Jr. Professor Emeritus of Mathematics at Yale University, and Curtis D. Robert Endowed Chair in Mathematics Education at Texas A&M University. He is known for his contributions to representation theory, in particular for the notion of a reductive dual pair and the Howe correspondence, and his contributions to mathematics education.

Biography
He attended Ithaca High School, then Harvard University as an undergraduate, becoming a Putnam Fellow in 1964.  He obtained his Ph.D. from University of California, Berkeley in 1969.  His thesis, titled On representations of nilpotent groups, was written under the supervision of Calvin Moore. Between 1969 and 1974, Howe taught at the State University of New York in Stony Brook before joining the Yale faculty in 1974. His doctoral students include Ju-Lee Kim, Jian-Shu Li, Zeev Rudnick, Eng-Chye Tan, and Chen-Bo Zhu. He moved to Texas A&M University in 2015.

He has been a fellow of the American Academy of Arts and Sciences since 1993, and a member of the National Academy of Sciences since 1994.

Howe received a Lester R. Ford Award in 1984. In 2006 he was awarded the American Mathematical Society Distinguished Public Service Award in recognition of his "multifaceted contributions to mathematics and to mathematics education." In 2012 he became a fellow of the American Mathematical Society. In 2015 he received the inaugural Award for Excellence in Mathematics Education.

A conference in his honor was held at the National University of Singapore in 2006,  and at Yale University in 2015.

Selected works

 Roger Howe, "Tamely ramified supercuspidal representations of ", Pacific Journal of Mathematics 73 (1977), no. 2, 437–460.  
 Roger Howe and Calvin C. Moore, "Asymptotic properties of unitary representations", Journal of Functional Analysis 32 (1979), no. 1, 72–96.
 Roger Howe, "θ-series and invariant theory", in Automorphic forms, representations and L-functions (Proc. Sympos. Pure Math., XXXIII, American Mathematical Society), pp. 275–285, (1979). 
 Roger Howe, "Wave front sets of representations of Lie groups". Automorphic forms, representation theory and arithmetic (Bombay, 1979), pp. 117–140, Tata Inst. Fund. Res. Studies in Math., 10, Tata Inst. Fundamental Res., Bombay, 1981. 
 Roger Howe, "On a notion of rank for unitary representations of the classical groups". Harmonic analysis and group representations, 223–331, Liguori, Naples, 1982. 

 Roger Howe, "Perspectives on invariant theory: Schur duality, multiplicity-free actions and beyond". The Schur lectures (1992) (Tel Aviv), 1–182, Israel Math. Conf. Proc., 8, Bar-Ilan Univ., Ramat Gan, 1995.
 Roger Howe & Eng-Chye Tan, "Nonabelian harmonic analysis. Applications of SL(2,R)". Universitext. Springer-Verlag, New York, 1992. xvi+257 pp. . 
 Roger Howe & William Barker (2007) Continuous Symmetry: From Euclid to Klein, American Mathematical Society, .
 Robin Hartshorne (2011) Review of Continuous Symmetry, American Mathematical Monthly 118:565–8.

See also
 Oscillator semigroup

References

External links
 
 

1945 births
Living people
Members of the United States National Academy of Sciences
20th-century American mathematicians
21st-century American mathematicians
Group theorists
Harvard University alumni
University of California, Berkeley alumni
Yale University faculty
Putnam Fellows
Fellows of the American Mathematical Society
Ithaca High School (Ithaca, New York) alumni